Telnar or Telnal is a village in Kapadvanj Taluka in Kheda district of Gujarat state, India.

Geography
Nearby villages are Nirmali, Lalpur, Abvel and Bhungariya. The village mainly consists of farmland on the outskirts with mountains and the Vatrak river.

Places of interest
On the bank of Vatrak river, about a mile from the village, there is a very old and lately repaired temple of Kedareshvar. Other major temple includes Utkanteshwar Mahadev situated 4 km from Telnar and located on the bank of the Vatrak river.

Communities
Kadva Patel is major community in the village. Telnar is one of more than 40 villages that have formed the Savaso Gaur Kadva Patidar Samaj organisation.

 Kadva Patel
 Rabari
 Prajapati
 Vaniya
Valand
Rajput
 Harijan
 Suthar
 Ravariya
 Vanjara

Economy 
Agriculture and dairy business plays a large part in the region's prosperity. Agricultural goods primarily consist of potatoes, cotton, fennel seeds, pearl millet and wheat.

Migration 
Lack of education and skills have let down progress of the village, but recently young generations have begun migrating to nearby cities including Kapadwanj, Ahmedabad, Anand and Gandhinagar.

Transport 
 By road: Telnar is 13 km from Kapadwanj and 50 km from Ahmedabad.
 By rail: Nearest railway station is in Nadiad which is 50 km from Telnar.
 By air: Nearest airport is in Ahmedabad which is 40 km from Telnar.

References

Villages in Kheda district